The 2013 Slovnaft Cup Final was the final match of the 2012–13 Slovak Cup, the 44th season of the top cup competition in Slovak football. The match was played at the Štadión MFK Ružomberok in Ružomberok on 1 May 2013 between MŠK Žilina and ŠK Slovan Bratislava. ŠK Slovan Bratislava won 2–0 and Slovan have a chance acquire double.

Road to the final

Match

Details

References

Slovak Cup Finals
Slovak Cup
Slovak Cup
Cup Final